Habibabad Tehran  (also Romanized as Ḩabībābād Tehran ) is a city in Asgariyeh Rural District of the Central District of Pishva County, Tehran province, Iran. At the 2006 National Census, its population was 2,333 in 551 households, when it was in the former Pishva District of Varamin County. The following census in 2011 counted 2,283 people in 585 households, by which time the district had been separated from the county and Pishva County established. The latest census in 2016 showed a population of 2,310 people in 621 households; it was the largest village in its rural district.

References 

Pishva County

Populated places in Tehran Province

Populated places in Pishva County